Amenoni Nasilasila (born 8 February 1992) is a Fijian rugby union footballer. He had played for the Fiji sevens team.

Career
Nasilasila grew up in Namatakula, the famous town known for creating rugby union and league stars like Noa Nadruku who is his uncle, Lote Tuqiri who is his cousin and Nemani Nadolo. He played rugby league and was part of the Fiji Residents Rugby league side, a feeder for the Fiji Bati. He wanted a career in rugby league and waited for 3 years for offers but then switched to rugby union joining a top local 7's club, Ratu Filise. He was spotted by then coach Ben Ryan who saw him playing in one of the local tournaments and included him in his extended side for the 2014 Gold Coast Sevens but an injury ruled him out on the eleventh hour. He made his debut at the 2014 Dubai Sevens making his debut against France scoring a try in their 54-7 thrashing. He did not make the Fiji side to the 2016 Olympic Games

He also represented his provincial side, Navosa in the Skipper Cup playing at playmaker and halfback. He captained the Fiji Barbarians 7's side top the SUDAmerica 7's in December 2016.

He was included by the new Fiji 7's coach, Gareth Baber for the 2016–17 World Rugby Sevens Series.

Nasilasila was selected as the 13th man for the first tournament, of the 2017–18 World Rugby Sevens Series, the 2017 Dubai Sevens but an injury to Waisea Nacuqu on Day One saw him getting selected for the main team and played very well and got praises from the coach  after helping Fiji beat the Australia in the dying stages of their final pool game and after Naququ failed to recover in time, he made the main team for the 2017 South Africa Sevens. His performance in that tournament saw him make the Dream Team for the first time as well as being named the DHL Impact Player of the Cape Town 7s.

Rape conviction
On October 23, 2019, Nasilasila was sentenced to eight years imprisonment for raping a 24-year-old woman on December 22, 2018. The incident took place at a settlement in Sigatoka.

References

External links
 Rugby.com
 

Fijian rugby union players
Living people
Fiji international rugby sevens players
1992 births
Fijian people convicted of rape
Rugby union wings
Pacific Islanders rugby union players
I-Taukei Fijian people
Fijian people of I-Taukei Fijian descent
Rugby union fly-halves
Rugby union scrum-halves
Male rugby sevens players
People from Namatakula
Commonwealth Games medallists in rugby sevens
Commonwealth Games silver medallists for Fiji
Rugby sevens players at the 2018 Commonwealth Games
Sportspeople convicted of crimes
Medallists at the 2018 Commonwealth Games